Matthews Snell (born August 18, 1941) is a retired professional football player who played for the New York Jets. He was Jets' owner Sonny Werblin's first coup, prior to his 1965 acquisition of Joe Namath.  A powerful fullback out of Ohio State University, Snell's 1964 signing jolted the crosstown Giants, who didn't draft Snell until the fourth round, and offered him a fraction of what the Jets gave him as their first-round choice.

Early career
Born to Isaac and Annie, Snell attended Carle Place High School in the one-square-mile town of Carle Place, New York, where his picture resides in the Carle Place High School Athletic Hall of Fame. Snell played right halfback on a team that lost only two games while he started. He was awarded Newsdays Thorp Award for 1959 as the outstanding high school football player in Nassau County.

At Ohio State University, Snell was a three-year starter and a consummate team player, active on both sides of the ball. In 1961, he played right halfback, often blocking for fullback Bob Ferguson or left halfback Paul Warfield.  In 1962, Snell was moved to defensive end. In 1963, Snell's senior year, he was named starting fullback, going on to rush for 491 yards and 5 touchdowns. At the end of his senior season, Snell was named his team's most valuable player.

Snell was named to the Ohio State Football All-Century Team in 2000 as a defensive end.

Football career
In his rookie year with the New York Jets, Snell rushed for a team-record 180 yards against the Houston Oilers on his way to a 945-yard season and AFL Rookie of the Year honors. Snell went on to become an AFL Eastern Division All-Star in 1964 and 1966, and the Sporting News All-AFL fullback in 1969.

Snell's defining moment came in Super Bowl III when the AFL champion Jets played the heavily-favored NFL champion Baltimore Colts. Although slowed by knee injuries, Snell was a key player in the Jets' ball-control offense during the 16–7 upset victory. He carried the ball 30 times for a then-Super Bowl record of 121 yards, and in the second quarter went four yards around left end to score the Jets' only touchdown, a score that marked the first time an AFL team had led in a Super Bowl. He also helped set up a trio of Jim Turner field goals that finally put the game away for the Jets in the second half, securing the AFL's first Super Bowl win in the league's penultimate season.

During his career, Snell was well known for his rushing, but also became an important part of the Jets' pass-blocking scheme. Toward the end of his career, Snell became one of the first third-down specialty backs, primarily because he was so good at protecting Joe Namath. He was also reported to have helped teach pass-blocking to Jets running backs during his career.

Snell suffered multiple injuries in his career, including torn knee cartilage in 1967 and a torn Achilles tendon in 1970. In 1971, he hurt his knee in the preseason and was diagnosed with a severe "knee bruise" and missed nine games. In 1972, in Week 4 versus the Miami Dolphins, he suffered a ruptured spleen. The injury was so severe that his spleen had to be removed, ending his season. He decided right then that he couldn't play anymore, though he didn't formally announce his retirement until the following March. He only played in a total of 12 games in what would be his final three seasons.

Post-football
In 1973, Snell appeared in the first Miller Lite beer commercial. According to the San Francisco Chronicle, "The campaign would feature a collection of middle-aged sports stars and become something of a status symbol for retired athletes for the next 17 years."

After his playing career in 1973, he sold his restaurant, Matt Snell's Fifth Down, to focus on his new company, Defco Securities, Inc. (of which he is one of the four partners).

Snell and Emerson Boozer were inducted into the Jets' Ring of Honor on November 29, 2015 because they were partners in each other's success and that of the team. Snell did not accept the Jets' invitation to participate in the ceremony at MetLife Stadium, just as he consistently has refused the club's invitations to other alumni events for unspecified reasons ever since he retired. In 2018, Snell revealed that the reason he hasn't spoken to the Jets was because the team's owner at the time he left, Leon Hess, refused to give him a reference for a future job in spite of both being promised he would receive one, and in spite of his work to build the team's success over his professional football career.

Personal life

Snell lives in New Rochelle, New York with his wife Sharon, son Beau and daughter Jada. His grandson Donte played football for Holy Cross High School. He is a partner in DEFCO Securities, Inc. and owns a restaurant in New York City. He is the first cousin, twice removed of running back Benny Snell, with Benny Snell's grandfather being his first cousin.

See also
List of American Football League players

References

Sources
 
 

1941 births
Living people
American football running backs
New York Jets players
Ohio State Buckeyes football players
American Football League All-Star players
American Football League All-League players
American Football League Rookies of the Year
People from Emanuel County, Georgia
Sportspeople from New Rochelle, New York
African-American players of American football
American Football League players
21st-century African-American people
20th-century African-American sportspeople
Carle Place High School alumni